Francis McDermott  (6 February 1874 – 24 August 1957) was an Australian politician.

He was born in Claremont in Tasmania. In 1939 he was elected to the Tasmanian House of Assembly as a Labor member for Franklin in a recount following the death of Premier Albert Ogilvie. He was defeated in 1941. McDermott died in Hobart in 1957.

References

1874 births
1957 deaths
Members of the Tasmanian House of Assembly
Australian Members of the Order of the British Empire
Australian Labor Party members of the Parliament of Tasmania